Edinboro may refer to:

Edinboro, Pennsylvania
 Edinboro University of Pennsylvania, in Edinboro
Edinboro, Saint Vincent and the Grenadines
 Jamie Barnwell-Edinboro, English footballer

See also
Edinburgh (disambiguation)